The Oriflamme (from Latin aurea flamma, "golden flame"), a pointed, blood-red banner flown from a gilded lance, was the battle standard of the King of France in the Middle Ages. The oriflamme originated as the sacred banner of the Abbey of St. Denis, a monastery near Paris. When the oriflamme was raised in battle by the French royalty during the Middle Ages, most notably during the Hundred Years War, no prisoners were to be taken until it was lowered. Through that tactic, they hoped to strike fear into the hearts of the enemy, especially the nobles, who could usually expect to be taken alive for ransom during such military encounters.

In French, the term oriflamme has come to mean any banner with pointed ends by association with the form of the original.

Legendary origin

The Oriflamme was mentioned in the 11th-century ballad the Chanson de Roland (vv. 3093–5) as a royal banner, first called Romaine and then Montjoie. According to legend, Charlemagne carried it to the Holy Land in response to a prophecy regarding a knight possessing a golden lance from which flames would burn and drive out the Saracens. That suggests that the lance was originally the important object, with the banner simply a decoration, but that changed over time.

History 
The Oriflamme was first used by Louis VI in 1124 and was last flown in battle at Agincourt in 1415, but a version of it remained in the Abbey of St. Denis until the 18th century.

Louis VI replaced the earlier banner of Saint Martin with the oriflamme of the Abbey of St. Denis, which floated about the tomb of St. Denis and was said to have been given to the abbey by King Dagobert.

Until the 12th century, the standard-bearer was the Comte de Vexin, who, as vowed to St. Denis, was the temporal defender of the abbey. Louis VI, having acquired Vexin, became standard-bearer. As soon as war began, he received Communion at St. Denis and took the standard from the tomb of the saint to carry it into combat.

Although the azure ground (from the blue cope of St. Martin of Tours) strewn with gold fleur-de-lis remained the symbol of royalty until the 15th century, the Oriflamme became the royal battle standard of the King of France, and it was carried at the head of the king's forces when they met another army in battle. It is recorded as having been carried at the following battles/campaigns:
Bouvines 1214
Seventh Crusade 1248
Mons-en-Pévèle 1304
Crécy 1346
Poitiers 1356
Roosebeke 1382
Agincourt 1415 (disputed; see below)

The Oriflamme was lost at least four times during its medieval history: Mons-en-Pévèle, Crécy,  Poitiers, and during the campaigns of the Seventh Crusade under King Louis IX.

Although the Oriflamme has often been depicted as present at the battle of Agincourt, modern historians have disputed that. The banner was given to Guillaume de Martel by Charles VI on September 10, 1415 and carried by Martel from Paris to Rouen.  That was likely an attempt to raise French morale and to rally troops, but there is no evidence that the Oriflamme was then taken on campaign and unfurled at Agincourt. Modern historians agree that the Oriflamme was not carried by Guillaume de Martel at Agincourt, as the king was not present at the battle in person.

In the 15th century, the fleur-de-lis on the white flag of Joan of Arc became the new royal standard replacing both the symbol of royalty and the Oriflamme on the battle field.

Appearance 
The banner was red or orange-red silk and flown from a gilded lance. According to legend, its colour stemmed from it being dipped in the blood of the recently-beheaded St. Denis.

The surviving descriptions of the Oriflamme are in Guillaume le Breton (13th century), in the "Chronicle of Flanders" (14th century), in the "Registra Delphinalia" (1456) and in the inventory of the treasury of Saint-Denis (1536). They show that the primitive Oriflamme was succeeded in the course of the centuries by newer Oriflammes, which bore little resemblance to one another except for their colour.

On battlefield 
According to Maurice Keen, the oriflamme, when displayed on the battlefield, indicated that no quarter
was to be given: its red colour being symbolic of cruelty and ferocity.

The bearer of the standard, the porte-oriflamme, became an office (like that of Marshal or Constable) and a great honour, as it was an important and very dangerous position to take charge of such a visible symbol in battle.  If things went badly, the bearer was expected to die, rather than relinquish his charge.

Froissart vividly describes porte-oriflamme Geoffroi de Charny's fall at the side of his king at the Battle of Poitiers in this passage:  

There Sir Geoffroi de Charny fought gallantly near the king (note: and his fourteen-year-old son). The whole press and cry of battle were upon him because he was carrying the king’s sovereign banner [the Oriflamme]. He also had before him his own banner, gules, three escutcheons argent. So many English and Gascons came around him from all sides that they cracked open the king’s battle formation and smashed it; there were so many English and Gascons that at least five of these men at arms attacked one [French] gentleman. Sir Geoffroi de Charny was killed with the banner of France in his hand, as other French banners fell to earth.

Notable bearers 

Geoffroi de Charny – 14th-century knight and author of several works on chivalry. He first bore the Oriflamme during the failed attempt to relieve Calais in 1347.
Arnoul d'Audrehem – 14th-century former Marshal of France. He held the office from 1368 to his death in 1370 but never carried the banner in action.
Guillaume de Martel – Seigneur de Bacqueville. He carried the Oriflamme at Agincourt and died there.
Sir Pierre de Villiers carried the Oriflamme at the Battle of Roosebeke against the Flemish rebels of Ghent led by Philip van Artvelde in 1382.

In literature 
In Canto XXXI of Paradiso, Dante describes the Virgin Mary in the Empyrean as pacifica oriafiamma (Musa's translation, "oriflame of peace"):

The 19th-century poet Robert Southey refers to the Oriflamme and its reputation in his poem Joan of Arc:

The 20th-century Martiniquais poet and politician, Aimé Césaire (1913–2008) invokes the Oriflamme in his poem "Your Hair" ("Chevelure"). By invoking the Oriflamme, Césaire also invokes the French Colonial Empire, war, and oppression. The poem is included in The Collected Poetry of Aimé Césaire. An excerpt reads:

The Oriflamme is depicted in season 2 episode 6 of the History Channel series Knightfall. 

In the Discworld novel Small Gods by Terry Pratchett, the flag of the theocracy of Omnia is referred to as an Oriflamme.

References

Flags of France
Military history of France
Personal flags